You and the Night and the Music is an album by American jazz pianist Mal Waldron recorded in 1983 and released by the Japanese Paddle Wheel label.

Reception
The Allmusic review by Ron Wynn awarded the album 4 stars, stating: "High-caliber lineup".

Track listing 
 "The Way You Look Tonight" (Dorothy Fields, Jerome Kern)  
 "Bags' Groove" (Milt Jackson)  
 "'Round Midnight" (Thelonious Monk)   
 "You and the Night and the Music" (Howard Dietz, Arthur Schwartz)  
 "Georgia on My Mind" (Hoagy Carmichael, Stuart Gorrell)  
 "Billie's Bounce" (Charlie Parker)   
 "Waltz for My Mother" (Mal Waldron)
Recorded at King Studios in Tokyo, Japan, on December 9, 1983

Personnel 
 Mal Waldron — piano 
 Reggie Workman — bass
 Ed Blackwell — drums

References 

Mal Waldron albums
1984 albums